The Thor-Able (Thor DM-18-Able) was an American expendable launch system and sounding rocket used for a series of re-entry vehicle tests and satellite launches between 1958 and 1960. It was a two-stage rocket, consisting of a Thor IRBM as a first stage and a Vanguard-derived Able second stage. On some flights, an Altair solid rocket motor was added as a third stage. It was a member of the Thor family and an early predecessor of the Delta.

Launch statistics

Rocket configurations

Launch outcome

Orbit

Function

Launch history

See also 
List of Thor and Delta launches
List of Thor and Delta launches (1957-1959)
List of Thor and Delta launches (1960-1969)
List of Thor DM-18 Agena-A launches
Thor (rocket family)
Thor DM-19 Delta

References 

Lists of Thor launches
Lists of Thor and Delta launches
Lists of rocket launches